Chimabachinae, the chimabachid moths, is a subfamily of moths in the family Lypusidae. The subfamily used to be classified as a subfamily of Oecophoridae, but current phylogenetic research classifies it as a subfamily of Lypusidae. Some authors placed it as the subfamily Cryptolechiinae in the family Depressariidae. The subfamily is distributed in the Palearctic realm, ranging from Europe to Japan, although the blueberry leafroller (Dasystoma salicella) has been introduced to North America.

The wings are broad and rounded and the ocelli are far from the eyes if they are present. The tops of the abdominal segments lack spiny setae which is the case for most related families.

Larvae feed on Betulaceae, Rosaceae and Ericaceae species. They eat the developing leaves, flowers and fruits. They also roll and tie the leaves to make shelters.

Taxonomy and systematics
 Diurnea Haworth, 1811
 Dasystoma Curtis, 1833

Gallery

References

Chimabachinae at funet
 Chimabachidae at Fauna Europeana

 
Lypusidae
Taxa named by Hermann von Heinemann
Moth subfamilies